Death Valley National Park
Dinoflagellate viral nucleoprotein